Tochni massacre refers to the killing of 84 Turkish Cypriots from the village of Tochni, Larnaca, Cyprus by Greek Cypriot members of EOKA B during the Turkish invasion of Cyprus in the Summer of 1974.

Background 

During the Turkish invasion at the north of the island, members of the Greek Cypriot paramilitary group EOKA B took hostage more than 80 Turkish Cypriot men from the village of Tochni and the nearby village of Zygi, including minor boys of age 13. After being kept at a Greek elementary school during the night, the arrested Turkish Cypriots were boarded in a bus. According to the only survivor of the massacre, Suat Hussein Kafadar, they were taken to the village of Palodia, where they were executed with automatic guns.

Total number of victims is 84 (78 from Tochni and 6 from Zygi) At the massacre site, according to Kafadar, there was a Greek officer. Kafadar said in an interview that a Greek military officer with three stars spoke with them during the night and reassured them that they would not get hurt. "My friend, don't be afraid. Today you are prisoners, tomorrow we will be yours. In the army, nobody abuses captives." 

The atrocity took place the same day as the massacre of Maratha, Santalaris and Aloda, again by Greek Cypriots members of EOKA B.

In 2016, Former Minister of Foreign Affairs of Cyprus Erato Kozakou-Marcoullis, said "I apologize to the Turkish Cypriots for 126 women and children killed in Aloda, Maratha and Santalaris and 85 civilian men killed in Tochni as a result of the horrific murders committed by EOKA B extremists on 14 August 1974.".

References 

Massacres in Cyprus
1974 in Cyprus
Greek war crimes
EOKA B
Mass murder in 1974
Massacres in 1974
Massacres of men
August 1974 events in Europe
Violence against men in Europe
Persecution of Turkish Cypriots
Deaths by firearm in Cyprus
Turkish invasion of Cyprus
1970s murders in Cyprus